The Cezam Prix Litteraire Inter CE is a literary prize which was established in France in 1997.  Its judging panel of more than 3600 readers who meet in groups to discuss, critique and individually rate the books, makes it one of the largest adjudicated readers' prizes for literature in the world.  It is organised by the French national network of comités d'entreprise (committees in workplaces of public and private enterprises which organise social and cultural events locally and nationwide).

The prize brings together readers from all over France and from all walks of life who are connected through their workplace or community.  They are registered and organised in groups by local librarians, supported by 40 independent bookstores and the network of 360 comités d'entreprise.  A shortlist of ten novels is selected each year from medium and small scale French publishing houses by the Cezam Prix Litteraire organisers and the prize has a history of discovering new authors, such as Claudie Gallay, before they become bestsellers.

The jury panels meet in workplaces, libraries, bookstores, high schools, colleges and even penitentiaries.  Author events are organised across France, with shortlisted writers from around the world being invited to visit the various regions to speak to and answer questions from the groups of readers.  Each reader then awards ratings on several criteria for each of the books that they have read and these ratings are gathered and counted to determine the winning book.  There are two levels of the prize: the votes are first counted at a local level to determine a winner for each of 25 regions then the votes are aggregated to determine the overall national prize-winner.

The 2011 winner was announced on Saturday 15 October in Strasbourg as Scottish author Peter May for his book The Blackhouse (L'Ile des Chasseurs d'Oiseaux).

Origin and aims of the prize
The prize was organised initially as a local prize in Nantes and Angers, but grew through the network of Cezam to encompass France.  It exists to promote reading, literacy and literature, not only by bringing groups of readers together to exchange thoughts with each other, but also by giving them the chance to meet and speak to the authors of the books.

Previous winners
 1997: Alain Monnier Un amour de Parpot
 1998/9: Georges-Jean Arnaud Le rat de la Conciergerie
 2000: Angèle Jacq Le voyage de Jabel
 2001: Françoise Moreau Eau-forte
 2002: Christian Petit Bombay Victoria
 2003: Soazig Aaron Le non de Klara
 2004: Emmanuel Dongala Johnny chien méchant
 2005: Thierry Maugenest Venise.net
 2006: Bertina Henrichs La joueuse d'échecs
 2007: Maïssa Bey Bleu, blanc, vert
 2008: Pierre Bordage Porteur d'âmes
 2009: Marie-Sabine Roger La tête en friche
 2010: Sebastian Barry Le testament caché (The Secret Scripture)
 2011: Peter May, L'ile des chasseurs d'oiseaux, (The Blackhouse)
 2012: Dan Waddel, for Code 1879
 2013: Hélène Gestern, for Eux sur la photo
 2014: Gilles Vincent, for Beso de la muerte
 2015: Jean-Paul Didierlaurent, for Le liseur du 6h27

References

External links

French literary awards
Awards established in 1997
1997 establishments in France